Pedro Bispo Moreira Júnior (born January 29, 1987, in Santana do Araguaia, Brazil), or simply Pedro Júnior, is a Brazilian striker who plays for Ponte Preta.

Club career
On 13 January 2020, it was confirmed that Júnior would join the Thai League club Samut Prakan City for the 2020 season.

Club statistics
Updated to 3 November 2018.

1Includes Japanese Super Cup.

Honours
Brazilian League (2nd division) – 2005
Rio Grande do Sul State League – 2006
Chile Octagonal Tournament – 2005
Emperor's Cup – 2009
 Campeonato Pernambucano in 2010 with Sport Recife

Wuhan Zall
China League One: 2018

References

External links

Profile at Kashima Antlers
Profile at Vissel Kobe

 
 
Pedro Júnior é vendido para o futebol japonês 

1987 births
Living people
Brazilian footballers
Association football forwards
Brazilian expatriate footballers
Brazilian expatriate sportspeople in South Korea
Grêmio Foot-Ball Porto Alegrense players
Vila Nova Futebol Clube players
Associação Desportiva São Caetano players
Cruzeiro Esporte Clube players
Omiya Ardija players
Albirex Niigata players
Gamba Osaka players
FC Tokyo players
Vissel Kobe players
Kashima Antlers players
Khor Fakkan Sports Club players
Expatriate footballers in Japan
J1 League players
J2 League players
Sport Club do Recife players
Jeju United FC players
K League 1 players
Expatriate footballers in South Korea
Brazilian expatriate sportspeople in Japan
Wuhan F.C. players
China League One players
UAE Pro League players
Campeonato Brasileiro Série B players
Brazilian expatriate sportspeople in China
Expatriate footballers in the United Arab Emirates
Brazilian expatriate sportspeople in the United Arab Emirates
Expatriate footballers in China
Fortaleza Esporte Clube players
Centro Sportivo Alagoano players
Associação Atlética Ponte Preta players
Sportspeople from Pará